Shimia isoporae is a Gram-negative, rod-shaped, aerobic and motile bacterium from the genus of Shimia which has been isolated from the coral Isopora palifera from Taiwan.

References 

Rhodobacteraceae
Bacteria described in 2011